1985 World Cup may refer to:
 1985 World Cup (men's golf)
 1985 World Cup (snooker)
 1985 IAAF World Cup